Krishna-Krishna is a 1986 Indian mythology movie, directed by Chandrakant. It stars Biswajeet, Vidya Sinha, Dara Singh, Anita Guha, Sudhir Dalvi and Ranjeet.

Story
It adapts various events, plays of Lord Krishna, from Mahabharata, Bhagavata Purana, such as Krishna Sudama at Sandipani Ashram, Panchajanya vadh, Pundarika vadh, Krishna and eight Queens, Krishna Tulabharam. Its very similar to Balram Shri Krishna movie, with Dara Singh starring as Balram in both.

Starring
 Biswajeet as Shri Krishna
 Vidya Sinha as Rukmini
 Dara Singh as Balram
 Anita Guha as Revati
 Jayshree Gadkar as Susheela
 Sudhir Dalvi as Sudama
 Ranjeet as Pondrik Krishna Vasudev

Soundtrack

"Mere Pran Chhoote Na Chhoote" - Anwar, Sharda
"Krishna Sudama" (Part-1) - Mahendra Kapoor	
"Krishna Sudama" (Part-2) - Mahendra 
"Krishna Sudama" (Part-3) - Mahendra Kapoor
"Nirmohi Natwar Se Pad Gaya Pala Re" - Asha Bhosle
"Sanwla Salona Shyam Rang Wala" + Chandrani Mukherjee, Sharda
"Sajan Tum Hume Yunhi Sataya Na Karna" - Sharda
"Chanda Suraj Ki Jyoti Ban" - Mahendra Kapoor

External links
 

1980s Hindi-language films
Hindu mythological films
1986 films
Films based on the Mahabharata
Films about Krishna
Films scored by Shankar–Jaikishan